Christopher Price may refer to:

 Christopher Price (broadcaster) (1967–2002), British radio and television broadcaster
 Christopher Price (politician) (1932–2015), British Labour Party Member of Parliament
 Christopher D. Price (born 1976), American conservative Baptist pastor, theologian, and writer
 Chris Price (footballer) (born 1960), English footballer
 Chris Price (musician) (born 1984), American musician, record producer and songwriter
 Chris Price (poet) (born 1962), New Zealand poet, editor and creative writing teacher